At least four types of the enzyme phosphodiesterase 4 (PDE4) are known:

 PDE4A
 PDE4B
 PDE4C
 PDE4D

See also
 3',5'-cyclic-AMP phosphodiesterase
 Phosphodiesterase (PDE)
 PDE4 inhibitor

Molecular biology